Michael Richard Seth Stone (1951 – May 2002) was an English recording engineer and record producer. He worked with Queen (multiple albums), Foreigner (multiple albums), Journey (multiple albums), Toby Beau, Asia (multiple albums), Whitesnake, April Wine (multiple albums), and others.

Biography
Stone began his career as an assistant recording engineer at Abbey Road Studios in England. While still a teenager, Stone worked on some sessions for The Beatles' Beatles For Sale (1964). Later, he became a runner at Trident Studios, then worked his way up to tape operator and assistant engineer. In 1974, Stone began a long relationship with Queen when he worked with Queen's then producer, Roy Thomas Baker, to engineer the unique vocal layering for "Bohemian Rhapsody". Following Baker's departure as Queen's producer, the band hired Stone as their engineer for his expertise in over-dubbing vocals. By the early eighties, Stone had produced popular top-selling albums for both Asia and Journey.

Stone was scheduled to oversee the re-mastering of the Queen catalogue when he died in 2002. Queen's Brian May wrote of Stone in a eulogy: "Mike's production style of big chorus building and hitting hard, the ability to treat vocals uniquely, and find space in a recording have influenced a generation of young producers."

Stone's work productivity was limited in later years by an alcohol problem, and he died of complications from it.

Selected discography
1971 Genesis – Nursery Cryme, Tape jockey
1973 Queen – Queen, Engineer
1974 Queen – Queen II, Engineer
1974 Queen – Sheer Heart Attack, Engineer
1975 Queen – A Night at the Opera, Engineer
1976 Queen – A Day at the Races, Engineer, Guest Vocalist
1977 Queen – News of the World, Engineer, Co-producer
1978 Toby Beau - Toby Beau, later re-released as "My Angel Baby", Engineer
1979 New England – New England, Producer, Engineer
1979 Shoes – Present Tense, Producer, Engineer
1980 New England - Explorer Suite Co-Producer
1981 Journey – Escape, Producer
1981 April Wine – The Nature of the Beast, Engineer, Co-producer
1981 April Wine – Live in London, Co-mixer
1982 Asia – Asia, Producer
1982 April Wine – Power Play, Co-producer
1983 Asia – Alpha, Producer
1983 April Wine – Animal Grace, Co-producer
1983 Journey – Frontiers, Producer
1984 Tommy Shaw – Girls with Guns, Producer
1985 April Wine – One for the Road, Co-producer
1985 Asia - Astra, Co-producer
1987 Whitesnake – Whitesnake, Producer
1987 Helix – Wild in the Streets, Co-producer
1988 Ratt – Reach for the Sky, Co-producer
1990 Y&T Ten, Producer
1995 Foreigner – Mr. Moonlight, Co-producer, Engineer
1996 Ten – Ten, Co-producer and mixer
1996 Ten – The Name of the Rose, Co-producer and mixer
1997 Ten – The Robe, Mixer

Notes

References for record producers with the name 'Mike Stone' often get confused. Others with this name are Mike D. Stone (10/24/1949 – 12/3/2017) of the Record Plant recording studio in Los Angeles, California who engineered for the Bee Gees, Joe Walsh, Frank Zappa, Peter Criss, Paul Stanley, America, and B. B. King,  and Mike "Clay" Stone of Clay Records who worked with largely punk and metal acts in the UK.

See also
:Category:Albums produced by Mike Stone (record producer)
:Category:Song recordings produced by Mike Stone (record producer)

References

1951 births
2002 deaths
English record producers
English audio engineers
Queen (band)
Asia (band)
Alcohol-related deaths in England